is a Japanese actress. She grew up in Ibaraki, Osaka.

She made her debut in 1996 at age 13 in an advertisement for Asahi Kasei's "Hebel Haus". In 2000, she won the Grand Prix at the “3rd Miss Tokyo Walker” competition (the first winner was Chiaki Kuriyama) and gained the supporting role in the 2002 J-horror film Dark Water. She has since appeared in many films, television dramas, and commercials.

Filmography

Film

Television drama

Other television

Web series

Other work

Stage
2005

Music video
2004 EXILE - "Heart of Gold"

Commercials
Asahi Kasei - Hebel Haus (1996)
123 Commercial TV stations - Atlanta Olympic (1996)
Nissan - Ichiro's Nissan (1999)
NTT West - Area Plus (1999)
Yotsuya Gakuin - Boat Version (2000)
Fujiya - Look Chocolate (2000)
Sega - Phantasy Star Online (2000)
Eisai - Chocola BB Pure (2000–2002)
Kadokawa Shoten - Weekly "The Television" (2001)
Coca-Cola - Sōken Bicha (2002)
Mos Burger - Vegetable Tsukune Burger (2002)
NTT docomo Kyūshū - FOMA (2003–2004)
NHK - Sports Campaign (2004)
P&G - Pantene (2003-ongoing)
Kanebo - T'Estimo (2007)
Casio - Exilim (2007-ongoing)
Yuna Ito - "Heart" (2007)
Ito En -　Tennen Bikō Jasmine Tea (2007-ongoing)
Subaru - Stella (2007)
Nippon Oil - New Slogan Announcement Version (2008-ongoing)
Sharp - Sharp Naruhodo Gekijō (2008-ongoing)
Toyota - Zanka Settei Type Plan (2009)
Ito En - Tea's Tea Bergamot and Orange Black Tea (2009)
Nippon Oil - Ene-Farm (2009)
Meiji Seika - Meiji Sweets Gum (2009)
Toyota - 20 Years Later : Live Action Doraemon : Shizuka (2011)
Wolt - Who's Wolt? (2021)

Awards

References

External links
Asami Mizukawa official website 

1983 births
Living people
Japanese film actresses
Japanese television actresses
Actresses from Kyoto Prefecture
People from Ibaraki, Osaka
20th-century Japanese actresses
21st-century Japanese actresses